Sünnet is a village in the Göynük District, Bolu Province, Turkey. Its population is 144 (2021).

The name "Sünnet" means circumcision ceremony.

References

Villages in Göynük District